Merry Riana: Mimpi Sejuta Dolar (English: Merry Riana: A Million Dollar Dream) is an Indonesian biographical drama film released on December 24, 2014. This film starred Dion Wiyoko, Chelsea Islan, Kimberly Ryder and Ferry Salim. The film is based on the book Mimpi Sejuta Dolar written by Merry Riana, an Indonesian motivator. The film tells the story of Merry Riana living in Singapore because of the May 1998 riots of Indonesia.

Plot 
The May 1998 riots of Indonesia mostly targets the ethnic Chinese. In Jakarta, 17-year-old Merry Riana's family flee to Soekarno–Hatta International Airport, where her father sells clothes and other riches to buy Merry a boarding pass to Singapore, asking her to study and live happily there. There, the overwhelmed and confused Merry meets high school friend Irene, who shelters her illegally at her dorm room. She was later caught, and after a discussion, Merry decides to study at Nanyang Technological University (NTU) in order to legally stay at Irene's room. However, she must pay the S$40,000 student loan. Irene's friend Alva promises to be her loan guarantor, but asks that she get a job. After a frustrating endeavour, she becomes a brochure sharer, although Alva has signed the agreement anyway. Because she does not have a student pass, the store was later taken down; luckily, evidence is limited, so the manager tells her to disguise herself.

Irene reveals to her that she has a crush on Alva and plans a date with him, however Alva is with Merry finding her a new job, and they subtly fall in love with each other. Merry is hired at Success Forever, a company which promises instant monetary miracles. She brings Alva there, and it turns out the company was a scam. Merry nearly gives up, but Alva tells her that failures are essential for success. He brings her to the Singapore Flyer, where she replaces Alva as janitor. Alva proposes to her by showing a novel titled s.h.m.i.l.y ("see how much I love you"), but Merry rejects. Irene kicks Merry out the dorm for being with Alva at the Flyer, seemingly romantically. Merry rushes to Alva's address to bring him and clarify things to Irene, but a naysaying guard claims Alva does not live in the address, when he is at a factory he is hired in. Irene leaves the dorm for Merry on anguish. Merry moves on from Irene, motivated by Alva, who shows her an online trading platform she can profit from.

At Valentine's night, Alva plans to propose Merry. Merry tells Alva of airline she can trade with. He disagrees, calling out her greed. Merry says that she is done being poor, assuming Alva has never been poor. Triggered, Alva leaves, and hands the wedding ring to an old street artist. Days later, she learns that the airline filed for Chapter 11 Bankruptcy. Her mother surprises her at the dorm, and tells her that she must finish what she started. To be resilient, she becomes an accountant; one of her customers, Mrs. Noor, helps her pay ¼ of the loan. One night, she reconciles with Irene.

One day, the street artist gives Alva's wedding ring to Merry who happens to be passing by; she reveals that Alva referred to her as "Shmily Merry." Merry runs to the Flyer and tells Alva that she loves him and apologises for her arrogance; Alva accepts. Years later, she graduates, and they later marry.

Songs 

 "Sempurnalah Cinta" – Andien & Marcell
 "Sempurnalah Cinta" (solo version) – Marcell Siahaan

Cast 
 Dion Wiyoko  as Alva
 Chelsea Islan  as Merry Riana/Merry
 Karim Niniek  as Miss Noor
 Kimberly Rider  as Irene Lee (Irren)
 Selen Fernandes  as Hars (security eater lollypop)
 Mike Lucock  as Success Forever Office Manajer
 Chyntia Lamusu  as Merry Riana's Mother
 Tuti Mentari  as Women who playing old violin
 Ferry Salim  as Merry Riana's father
 Special appearance
 Julia Perez as office manager
 Bella Garnier 
 Merry Riana

References 

 Merry Riana: Mimpi Sejuta Dolar, www.21cineplex.com, accessed on November 23, 2014

2010s biographical drama films
2014 films
Indonesian biographical films
Drama films based on actual events